Igor Aleksandrovich Surov (born 16 November 1985) is a former Russian footballer.

Career

Club
He made his professional debut in 2007 for Moldovan National Division club FC Politehnica Chişinău.

In March 2017, Surov was registered by Tajik League side CSKA Pamir Dushanbe for their upcoming season, playing 8 league, and 2 cup games before leaving the club in July 2017, retiring back to Krasnodar to coach junior football.

References

External links
 
 

1985 births
People from Kanevskoy District
Living people
Russian footballers
Association football defenders
FC Oryol players
FC Saturn Ramenskoye players
CSKA Pamir Dushanbe players
Moldovan Super Liga players
Tajikistan Higher League players
Russian expatriate footballers
Expatriate footballers in Moldova
Russian expatriate sportspeople in Moldova
Expatriate footballers in Tajikistan
Russian expatriate sportspeople in Tajikistan
FC Volga Ulyanovsk players
FC Mashuk-KMV Pyatigorsk players
Sportspeople from Krasnodar Krai